The Limestone Hills,  el. , is a sub-range of the Big Belt Mountains southwest of Townsend, Montana in Broadwater County, Montana.

See also
 List of mountain ranges in Montana

Notes

Mountain ranges of Montana
Landforms of Broadwater County, Montana